The Bucharest light rail ( or "light metro") is a light rail transit system in Bucharest, Romania.

Operated by the Societatea de Transport București (STB), the municipal public transit operator, the service is technically similar to a light rail and not to a light metro system.

History

Light rail use more modern rolling stock than trams and also run on separate designated corridors for faster travel times.

The first line (41) was opened in 2002, and runs through the west part of the city (from FC Steaua București's Ghencea Stadium in the south-west, to the House of the Free Press in the north). (41) tram line is single on its route, meeting other lines only at the end, the 3 route at Piața Presei Libere and the 47 route at Ghencea.

Light rail tram lines 32 and 21 are considered light rail due to their low waiting times, superior speed and segregated pathways. They also use new or modernized rolling stock. 32 is single until Calea Ferentari where it meets 11 for a short distance and 23, 27, 7 and 47 from 11 Iunie until its end at Piața Unirii. 21 is mainly single on its route, sharing the line and stops with tram routes 16 and 5 from Piața Sf. Gheorghe to Strada Paleologu. At Bucur Obor (Șoseaua Colentina), it meets route 36 for a short distance, although they have no common stops.  From Obor to the other end, it is again single.

Lines 1 and 10 are considered light rail; due to recent modernizations, these routes use upgraded tracks for almost the entire line and mostly new rolling stock. They form a ring around central Bucharest, with line 10 running services clockwise (from Romprim – Piața Sudului – Șura Mare – Șoseaua Viilor – Pasaj Basarab – Bucur Obor – Pod Mihai Bravu – Piața Sudului – Romprim) and line 1 running services counterclockwise (from Romprim – Piața Sudului – Pod Mihai Bravu – Bucur Obor – Pasaj Basarab – Șoseaua Viilor – Șura Mare – Piața Sudului – Romprim). In 2021, it entered in rehabilitation, from Bd Timișoara to Bd Vasile Milea, in order to accommodate new rolling stock.

Line 25, which appeared in 2007 as a temporary line to replace 35, during PASAJ BASARAB works, got highly successful. It has a short waiting time, and quite fast travel, so it is considered light rail by many citizens, owing to its fully modernised track and quite high speed and high demand. Only downside may be considered old rolling stock. 

All of these lines will receive new rolling stock from May 2022.

See also 
Transport in Bucharest
Bucharest Metro

References

External links

Railway lines opened in 2002
Light rail in Romania
Transport in Bucharest
2002 establishments in Romania

fr:Tramway de Bucharest